Japan Air Lines Cargo Flight 1628 was a UFO incident that occurred on November 17, 1986, involving a Japanese Boeing 747-200F cargo aircraft. The aircraft was en route from Paris to Narita International Airport, near Tokyo, with a cargo of Beaujolais wine. On the Reykjavík to Anchorage section of the flight, at 17:11 over eastern Alaska, the crew first witnessed two unidentified objects to their left. These abruptly rose from below and closed in to escort their aircraft. Each had two rectangular arrays of what appeared to be glowing nozzles or thrusters, though their bodies remained obscured by darkness. When closest, the aircraft's cabin was lit up and the captain could feel their heat on his face. These two craft departed before a third, much larger disk-shaped object started trailing them. Anchorage Air Traffic Control requested an oncoming United Airlines flight to confirm the unidentified traffic, but when it and a military craft sighted JAL 1628 at about 17:51, no other craft could be distinguished. The sighting lasted 50 minutes and ended in the vicinity of Denali.

Observation
On November 17, 1986, the Japanese crew of a JAL Boeing 747 cargo freighter witnessed three unidentified objects after sunset while flying over eastern Alaska. The objects seemed to prefer the cover of darkness to their left, and to avoid the brighter skies to their right. At least the first two of the objects were observed by all three crew members: Captain , an ex-fighter pilot with more than 10,000 hours flight experience, in the cockpit's left-hand seat; co-pilot   in the right-hand seat; and flight engineer .

At 17:09, the Anchorage ATC advised a new heading towards Talkeetna, Alaska.

Two objects

These were pacing his flight path and speed.

In doing so they activated "a kind of reverse thrust, and [their] lights became dazzlingly bright". To match the speed of the aircraft from their sideways approach, the objects displayed what Terauchi described as a disregard for inertia: "The thing was flying as if there was no such thing as gravity. It sped up, then stopped, then flew at our speed, in our direction, so that to us it [appeared to be] standing still. The next instant it changed course. ... In other words, the flying object had overcome gravity." The "reverse thrust" caused a bright flare for three to seven seconds, to the extent that captain Terauchi could feel the warmth of their glows.
At 17:19:15 the pilots notified air-traffic control, which could not confirm any traffic in the indicated position. After three to five minutes the objects assumed a side-to-side configuration, which they maintained for another 10 minutes. They accompanied the aircraft with an undulating motion, and some back and forth rotation of the jet nozzles, which seemed to be under automatic control, causing them to flare with brighter or duller luminosity.

Each object had a square shape, consisting of two rectangular arrays of what appeared to be glowing nozzles or thrusters, separated by a dark central section. Captain Terauchi speculated in his drawings, that the objects would appear cylindrical if viewed from another angle, and that the observed movement of the nozzles could be ascribed to the cylinders' rotation. The objects left abruptly at about 17:23:13, moving to a point below the horizon to the east.

Third object

Where the first objects disappeared, Captain Terauchi now noticed a pale band of light that mirrored their altitude, speed and direction. Setting their onboard radar scope to a  range, he confirmed an object in the expected 10 o'clock direction at about  distance, and informed ATC of its presence. Anchorage found nothing on their radar, but Elmendorf's NORAD Regional Operations Control Center (ROCC), directly in his flight path, reported a "surge primary return" after some minutes.

As the city lights of Fairbanks began to illuminate the object, captain Terauchi believed to perceive the outline of a gigantic spaceship on his port side that was "twice the size of an aircraft carrier". It was, however, outside first officer Tamefuji's field of view. The short-range radar at Fairbanks airport failed, however, to register the object.

Anchorage ATC offered military intervention, which was declined by the pilot, due to his knowledge of the Mantell incident. The object was not noted by either of two planes which approached JAL 1628 to confirm its presence, by which time JAL 1628 had also lost sight of it. JAL 1628 arrived safely in Anchorage at 18:20.

Aftermath
Captain Terauchi cited in the official Federal Aviation Administration report that the object was a UFO. In December 1986, Terauchi gave an interview to two Kyodo News journalists. JAL soon grounded him for talking to the press and moved him to a desk job. He was reinstated as a pilot several years later, and retired eventually in the north Kanto, Japan.

Kyodo News contacted Paul Steucke, the FAA public information officer in Anchorage on December 24, and received confirmation of the incident, followed by UPI on the 29th. The FAA's Alaskan Region consulted John Callahan, the FAA Division Chief of the Accidents and Investigations branch, as they wanted to know what to tell the media about the UFO. John Callahan was unaware of any such incident, considering it a likely early flight of a stealth bomber, then in development. He asked the Alaskan Region to forward the relevant data to their technical center in Atlantic City, New Jersey, where he and his superior played back the radar data and tied it in with the voice tapes by videotaping the concurrent playbacks.

A day later at FAA headquarters, they briefed Vice Admiral Donald D. Engen, who watched the whole video of over half an hour, and asked them not to talk to anybody until they were given the OK, and to prepare an encompassing presentation of the data for a group of government officials the next day. The meeting was attended by representatives of the FBI, CIA and President Reagan's Scientific Study Team, among others. Upon completion of the presentation, all present were told that the incident was secret and that their meeting "never took place". According to Callahan, the officials considered the data to represent the first instance of recorded radar data on a UFO, and they took possession of all the presented data. John Callahan however managed to retain the original video, the pilot's report and the FAA's first report in his office. The forgotten target print-outs of the computer data were also rediscovered, from which all targets can be reproduced that were in the sky at the time.

After a three-month investigation, the FAA formally released their results at a press conference held on March 5, 1987. Here Paul Steucke retracted earlier FAA suggestions that their controllers confirmed a UFO, and ascribed it to a "split radar image" which appeared with unfortunate timing. He clarified that "the FAA [did] not have enough material to confirm that something was there", and though they were "accepting the descriptions by the crew" they were "unable to support what they saw". The McGrath incident was revealed here amongst the ample set of documents supplied to the journalists.

The sighting received special attention from the media, as a supposed instance of the tracking of UFOs on both ground and airborne radar, while being observed by experienced airline pilots, with subsequent confirmation by an FAA Division Chief.

Skeptical reactions

UFO researcher Philip J. Klass investigated the incident and wrote in his book The UFO Invasion that:

According to UFO skeptic Robert Sheaffer, "[t]he bottom line is, Terauchi’s own flight crew saw only 'lights,' and other aircraft checking out the situation saw nothing unusual."

Subsequent Alaskan sightings

Alaska Airlines Flight 53 incident
On 29 January 1987 at 18:40, Alaska Airlines Flight 53 observed a fast moving object on their onboard weather radar.

While they could not distinguish any object or light visually, they noticed that the radar object was increasing its distance at a very high rate. The object was outside the radar range of the Anchorage ARTCC, and additional radar data covering the specified time and location failed to substantiate the pilots' claim.

KC-135 observation
A US Air Force KC-135 jet flying from Anchorage to Fairbanks once again observed a very large, disk-shaped object on January 30, 1987. The object then disappeared out of sight.

In popular culture
The incident was described on an episode of the documentary series The Unexplained Files, broadcast on Science Channel on 23 September 2014.

Notes

References

Further reading
 Leslie Kean, 2010, UFOs: Generals, Pilots, and Government Officials Go On the Record 
 Kendrick Frazier et al., 1997, The UFO Invasion  – includes a reprint of "FAA data sheds new light on JAL pilot's report" by Philip J. Klass in Skeptical Inquirer 11 (4): 322–326. 1987.

External links 
 
 

1986 in Alaska
Accidents and incidents involving the Boeing 747
Alleged UFO-related aviation incidents
Aviation accidents and incidents in 1986
1628
November 1986 events in Asia